The 2010 season was Samut Songkhram's 3rd season in the top division of Thai football. This article shows statistics of the club's players in the season, and also lists all matches that the club played in the season.

Team kit

Chronological list of events
10 November 2009: The Thai Premier League 2010 season first leg fixtures were announced.
25 August 2010: Samut Songkhram were knocked out by Chonburi in the FA Cup fourth round.
24 October 2010: Samut Songkhram finished in 8th place in the Thai Premier League.

Players

Current squad
As of January 18, 2010

2010 Season transfers
In

Out

Results

Thai Premier League

League table

FA Cup

Third round

Fourth round

League Cup

First round

1st Leg

2nd Leg

First round

1st Leg

2nd Leg

Queen's Cup

References

2010
Thai football clubs 2010 season